Interleukin enhancer-binding factor 3 is a protein that in humans is encoded by the ILF3 gene.

Function 

Nuclear factor of activated T-cells (NFAT) is a transcription factor required for T-cell expression of interleukin 2. NFAT binds to a sequence in the IL2 enhancer known as the antigen receptor response element 2. In addition, NFAT can bind RNA and is an essential component for encapsidation and protein priming of hepatitis B viral polymerase. NFAT is a heterodimer of 45 kDa and 90 kDa proteins, the larger of which is the product of this gene. The encoded protein, which is primarily localized to ribosomes, probably regulates transcription at the level of mRNA elongation. At least three transcript variants encoding three different isoforms have been found for this gene.

Interactions 

ILF3 has been shown to interact with:

 DNA-PKcs,
 FUS, 
 PRMT1 
 Protein kinase R,  and
 XPO5. 
C5orf36

Small NF90/ILF3-associated RNAs (snaR) (~120 nucleotides long) and are known to interact with ILF3 double-stranded RNA-binding motifs. snaR-A is abundant in human testis and has been shown to associate with ribosomes in HeLa cells. snaR-A is present in human and gorilla but not in chimpanzee. Other snaR RNAs are found in African Great Apes (including chimpanzee and bonobo).

ILF2 and ILF3 have been identified as autoantigens in mice with induced lupus, in canine systemic rheumatic  autoimmune disease, and as a rare finding in humans with autoimmune disease.

References

Further reading

External links 
 

Transcription factors